Apolonia "Miss Loni" Van Voorden (April 14, 1926 - November 11, 2012) was a Dutch American foot juggler who began her career at the age of 10 in her father's family circus in the Netherlands.

Born in Amsterdam, Netherlands, in 1926, Van Voorden emigrated to the United States on March 28, 1950 and gave her first performance there with the Ringling Bros. and Barnum & Bailey Circus, working in a display with juggler Francis Brunn. After being introduced to Cecil B. Demille she was asked to be in his 1952 movie, The Greatest Show on Earth. Ten years later in 1962 she was cast as a circus performer in the movie Billy Rose's Jumbo.

Ms. Van Voorden became a naturalized United States Citizen on July 9, 1963.

In addition to performing with the Ringling Bros. and Barnum & Bailey Circus, Van Voorden's extensive career also saw her juggle with Circus Vargas,  The Polack Brothers Circus, and Minsky's Follies. She regularly performed at various venues such as "... fairs, festivals, night clubs, and special events." For two years Ms. Van Voorden was also featured as a half-time act with the Harlem Globetrotters.

Ms. Van Voorden was voted the "Queen of the Circus" in 1961 by the International Circus Fans Association.

Filmography

External links 

 Miss Loni page at IMDB
 Portage County Historical Society page on "Extraordinary Circus Artists - Miss Loni"

References

1926 births
2012 deaths
Jugglers
Dutch circus performers
American acrobatic gymnasts
Dutch emigrants to the United States
Female acrobatic gymnasts
Entertainers from Amsterdam